Aslı Sümen is a Turkish actress and model, who was selected as Miss Turkey 2017. 

She is a dancer and a model.

Itır Esen was originally selected as Miss Turkey 2017 and Aslı Sümen was a runner up, but Esen was dethroned after a controversial tweet about the 2016 Turkish coup d'état attempt. Sümen was enthroned as Miss Turkey 2017 and represented Turkey at Miss World 2017 on 26 November 2017.

Acting Career

In 2021, she starred in TV series Baht Oyunu as Tuğçe Dikman alongside Cemre Baysel, Aytaç Şaşmaz and İdris Nebi Taşkan. In 2022, she had role in digital series Erkek Severse as Ezgi Uysal. Next she portrayed character of Ayşegül in TV series Gülümse Kaderine, which was unfortunately cancelled after 5th episode.

Filmography

References

Living people
Year of birth missing (living people)
Miss World 2017 delegates